Arvid de Kleijn (born 21 March 1994) is a Dutch cyclist, who currently rides for UCI ProTeam .

Major results

2016
 1st Paris–Tours Espoirs
 2nd GP Horsens
 4th Nationale Sluitingprijs
 4th Fyen Rundt
 5th Road race, National Under-23 Road Championships
2017
 1st Nationale Sluitingsprijs
 1st Antwerpse Havenpijl
 1st Stage 3 Tour du Loir-et-Cher
 2nd Ronde van Noord-Holland
 2nd Ronde van Limburg
 4th Grote Prijs Stad Sint-Niklaas
 4th Ronde van Overijssel
 5th Road race, National Road Championships
 8th Arnhem–Veenendaal Classic
 9th Arno Wallaard Memorial
2019
 1st Midden–Brabant Poort Omloop
 1st Druivenkoers Overijse
 1st Stage 1 Course de Solidarność et des Champions Olympiques
 1st Stage 3 Tour du Loir-et-Cher
 1st Stage 4 Kreiz Breizh Elites
 2nd Overall Tour de Normandie
1st Stage 3
 2nd De Kustpijl
 3rd Tacx Pro Classic
 5th Gooikse Pijl
 7th Veenendaal–Veenendaal Classic
2020
 3rd Gooikse Pijl
 7th Scheldeprijs
2021
 1st Stage 1 Tour of Turkey
 1st Route Adélie
 5th Paris–Chauny
 8th Gran Piemonte
2022
 1st Stage 1 Four Days of Dunkirk
2023
 1st Milano–Torino

References

External links

1994 births
Living people
Dutch male cyclists
People from Overbetuwe
20th-century Dutch people
21st-century Dutch people
Cyclists from Gelderland